The 1910 Clemson Tigers football team represented Clemson Agricultural College—now known as Clemson University—as a member of the Southern Intercollegiate Athletic Association (SIAA) during the 1910 college football season. Under first-year head coach Frank Dobson, the team compiled an overall record of 4–3–1 with a mark of 2–3–1 in conference play.  W. H. Hanke was the captain.

Schedule

References

Bibliography
 

Clemson
Clemson Tigers football seasons
Clemson Tigers football